"Perfect Timing (Intro)" is a song by Canadian rapper Nav and American record producer Metro Boomin. It is the title track and one of the dual singles from their collaborative mixtape Perfect Timing. The song was released for digital download on July 14, 2017, alongside "Call Me". The song was written by the artists and Southside, who produced the song with Metro Boomin..

Music video
The music video for "Perfect Timing" was released on July 21, 2017 on Nav's Vevo account and was directed by Glenn Michael & Christo Anesti. As of August 2022, the video has surpassed over 6.8 million views.

Track listing

Charts

Release history

Notes

References

2017 songs
2017 singles
Metro Boomin songs
Nav (rapper) songs
Republic Records singles
XO (record label) singles
Song recordings produced by Metro Boomin
Songs written by Metro Boomin
Songs written by Nav (rapper)
Songs written by Southside (record producer)
Trap music songs